Ciarán Joseph Griffiths (born 3 March 1983) is an English actor. His role in television include Gary Best in The Bill and Micky Maguire in Shameless.

Biography
Griffiths was born in Manchester to a Welsh father and Irish mother, and attended St Mary's RC High School in Astley near Leigh, between 1994 and 1999; it was during this time that he starred in Children's Ward at the age of thirteen.

Aside from his long-running roles in The Bill and Shameless, Griffiths has made guest appearances on Coronation Street, Clocking Off, Waterloo Road and numerous other programmes.

In 2007, Griffiths starred alongside Conrad Westmaas in the short film The Visitor. He also appeared as "Psycho" in the film There's Only One Jimmy Grimble.

He also starred in the British vampire film Dead Cert which was directed by Steven Lawson, and he appeared in Waterloo Road as Dylan Hodge in Series 6 in 2010/2011.

In the August 2011 issue of Attitude Magazine, Griffiths took his top off and appeared sporting a red boxing kit. Photos from the shoot were taken at Cloud 23 Bar in the Hilton Hotel in Manchester.

In 2016, he appeared in Vera, on ITV in the episode, "The Sea Glass", he played the role of Steve Stonnall.

In April 2018, Griffiths appeared in 'All I See Is You' by Katherine Smith at Octogan Theatre in Bolton. The play is inspired by real accounts of queer life from the 1960s. It toured nationally, and to Dublin, Sydney and Melbourne in 2019.

On New Year's Day 2018, Griffiths made a guest appearance in the BBC One soap opera, EastEnders, playing Milo.

In 2020, Griffiths starred in an episode of the BBC One drama Casualty, as Peter Hawker, a man who'd suffered a brain injury.

Filmography
Film

Television

Video Games

References

External links 

1983 births
Living people
English people of Irish descent
English people of Welsh descent
English male television actors
English male film actors
Male actors from Manchester